The Northern Football Conference (NFC) is a semi-professional Canadian football league with franchises based primarily in Ontario, Canada. The league consists of eight teams and runs from May until mid-August. It's the oldest running senior amateur football league in Canada.

The league began playing in 1954 (then they were known as Northern Ontario Rugby Football Union) with four teams participating, and has operated continuously with as many as 11 teams since then. The annual league champion is awarded the Plaunt Memorial Trophy, named for Greater Sudbury veteran Donald Plaunt who was killed in action during World War II.

In 2000, the NFC became a founding member of the Canadian Senior Football League, which is now known as the Canadian Major Football League. The CMFL is the national governing body for semi-pro Canadian football. Every September the NFC champion meets the champion of the Alberta Football League to determine the national champion (Sid Forster Memorial Trophy), with the game site alternating each year.

History
During the early 1950s Kirkland Lake football players played exhibition games against the Tri-towns (Cobalt, Haileybury, New Liskeard) area, and would later form Youth Club football teams called Kirkland Lake Alouettes and Tri-town Raiders. In 1952 the Sudbury Amateur Football Club was formed (would later change its name to Sudbury Hardrocks) and started participating in those games, while a team from North Bay (North Bay Roughriders) joined in 1953. In 1954 the teams petitioned the Canadian Rugby Union for the privilege of operating a "recognized" league called the "Northern Ontario Rugby-Football Union".

1954

Championship series (Best of 3):
Sudbury 24 vs. North Bay 7
Sudbury 14 vs. North Bay 14
Sudbury 22 vs. North Bay 6

1955-1963
After the inaugural season, the league struggled to attract local fans, but by the end of the decade the league was embraced by the northern communities. The Sturgeon Falls Bombers joined the league as an expansion team in 1955, while Rouyn-Noranda Fantassins and the North Renfrew Rams joined a year later.

Beginning in 1955 the NORFU champions went on to compete for the Ontario Intermediate championship. The teams from the south region won all nine contests, but the games became very close as the decade wore on. By the end of the Northern Ontario Rugby-Football Union's first decade it established itself as a "major" sport in many northern communities.

The Sudbury Hardrocks captured the Plaunt Memorial Trophy five times, the Sturgeon Falls Bombers captured it on three consecutive occasions and the North Bay Ti-Cats and the North Renfrew Rams captured it once each.

1964-1972
In 1967 the Northern Ontario Rugby-Football Union changed its name to the Northern Football Conference, to coincide with the parent Canadian Rugby Union league which renamed itself the Canadian Football League (CFL).

The number of members in the league remained relatively stable during this period but there was much change among the membership. The Sudbury team renamed itself the Spartans in 1967, while the Kirkland Lake team changed its name to Kougars in 1968 before folding after the 1971 season. Sturgeon Falls Bombers were forced to take a leave of absence following the 1963 season but returned for four more seasons before ultimately folding in 1968. The Rouyn-Noranda club returned for one more season of play in 1965 but ceased operations thereafter. There were a number of new teams entering the league during this period. Val D'Or Jets, from another western Quebec community, entered a team in the league in 1965 and remained until 1970 but took a leave of absence in 1969. Timmins Falcons entered in 1966 and remained until 1971 but took a leave of absence for the 1970 season. The 1972 season saw two new entrants to the Northern Football Conference; Sault Ste. Marie Steelers, which took over the Timmins operation, and Laurentian University, which purchased much of the Kirkland Lake assets and needed a place to compete after leaving Ontario University Athletics. Both commenced operation in 1972.

Sudbury captured five Plaunt Memorial Trophies and North Bay won three. The only other team to win a Conference title during this period was the first year Sault Ste. Marie Steelers in 1972.

The two league champions from the Northern Football Conference and the Ontario Football Conference faced each other on three occasions in the early 1970s. The only title earned by NFC team came in 1972, when Sault Ste. Marie Steelers beat the London Lords 26–7.

1973-1977
Before the 1973, the NFC become the only remaining senior amateur/ semi-pro football league in Canada, and the Bramalea Satellites from the Ontario Football Conference joined the league. Despite that, the league experienced rough times following its twentieth anniversary. With the folding of the Laurentian University team after the 1973 season and the Bramalea Satellites withdrawing to compete at the Ontario junior level after the 1974 season, the Northern Football Conference had declined to three teams for the 1975 season:  Sudbury Spartans, North Bay Ti-Cats and Sault Ste. Marie Steelers.

In attempt to encourage new clubs to join the league, the league decided to include more game innovations, including adopting a summer schedule for the 1976 season, playing with four downs rather than the traditional three downs and allowing local University players to compete. The league returned to a four team lineup in 1976, when the Orillia Silver Bombers joined as an expansion team.

The Bramalea Satellites captured back to back crowns in their only two years in the league (1973-1974) and the Sault Ste. Marie Steelers returned to league prominence by capturing back to back championships (1975-1976) as well. Sudbury added its eleventh title when the Spartans captured the championship in 1977.

1978-1991
The league expanded to seven teams In 1978 by adding three new teams, the Etobicoke Argonauts, the Oakville Longhorns and the Stoney Creek Patriots. In 1982 the Stoney Creek Patriots moved to Hamilton and became the Wildcats, while the Brampton Bears joined in 1985. By 1988 the Sault Ste Marie Steelers folded before the start of the season and the league had again declined to three teams (Sudbury Spartans, Oakville Longhorns and Brampton Bears) but the league returned to a four team lineup a year later when the Brampton Bulldogs were added (they moved to North Bay for the 1991 season).

Sudbury captured six more titles, including four in a row (1982-1985), the Stoney Creek Patriots and Oakville Longhorns each captured three titles and the Brampton Bears and the Sault Ste. Marie Steelers each captured one championship.

1992-1999
In the beginning of 1992 the NFC and the Central Ontario Football League decided to merge, as the Toronto Eagles and the Scarborough Crimson Tide, joined the Northern Football Conference and expanding it to six teams. in 1995, the Hamilton Wild Cats, who had competed in the American Football Association replaced the Crimson Tide as the league sixth team. The Brampton Bears withdrew from the league before the 1996 season and were replaced by Sault Ste. Marie Storm, while the North Bay Bulldogs took a leave of absence from the league for the 1996 season and the Hamilton Wild Cats ceased operations after the second week of the season leaving the Northern Football Conference with four teams for the season. The 1997 season saw the league returned to six teams, when Peterborough Packers and North Bay Bulldogs joined.

The Oakville Longhorns have held the Plaunt Memorial Trophy Championship since 1993.

2000-Present
In 2000 the NFC joined forces with the Alberta Football League for a National Championship from Canadian Senior Football League (changed to Canadian Major Football League in 2003). The NFC champions, Oakville Longhorns, beat Manitoba Football League's Winnipeg Mustangs 42–14 in the first contest.

After the 2019 season two league players, Graham Kelly and Archelaus Jack turned pro and drafted by The Liga de Fútbol Americano Profesional (LFA) in part of an agreement with the CFL, which placed two players from Canada on the rosters of the Mexican teams.

The league canceled the 2020 and 2021 seasons due to the COVID-19 pandemic.

Rules
The NFC plays by rules of the Canadian Rule Book for Amateur Football, with the following exceptions:
 Four downs are used instead of three.
 In the regular season, overtime is played to a maximum of two possessions per team.

Teams

Former teams

Belleville Panthers
Bramalea Satellites
Brampton Bears
Brampton Bulldogs
Deep River Rams
Durham Hawkeyes
Etobicoke Argonauts
Hamilton Wild Cats
Hamilton Wildcats
Kingston Privateers
Kirkland Lake Alouettes
Kirkland Lake Kougars
Laurentian University Voyageurs
Markham Raiders
Mega City Maddogs
Milton Marauders
Mississauga Wolverines
Montreal Transit
North Bay Bulldogs
North Bay Northmen
North Bay Ti-Cats
North Renfrew Rams
Orillia Silver Bombers
Oshawa Hawkeyes
Peterborough Packers
Quinte-Limestone Panthers
Rouyn-Noranda Fantassins
Sault Ste. Marie Steelers (1972-88)
Scarborough Crimson Tide
Stoney Creek Patriots
Sturgeon Falls Bombers
Timmins Falcons
Toronto Eagles
Toronto Maddogs
Toronto Raiders
Toronto Titans
Tri Town Miners
Tri Town Raiders
Val D’Or Jets

League champions

Hall of Fame
The Northern Football Conference "Hall of Fame & Life Members" was established in 1985 to recognize outstanding contributions to the league. The inaugural 1985 class of inductees included: 
 Sid Forster (Builder), Sudbury & NFC - Also member of the Canadian Football Hall of Fame (class of 2001).
 James Pestolis (Builder), Sturgeon Falls & NFC
 Ron Preston (Player), Kirkland Lake & NFC
 Larry Avery (Player), North Bay
 John Clifford (Player), Sturgeon Falls

References

2
Canadian football in Ontario
1954 establishments in Canada
Sports leagues established in 1954